Albaton is an unincorporated community in Fairview Township, Monona County, Iowa, United States.

There is a shed and a Thomas the Train tank engine. 

A small church that goes by the name Skien Lutheran Church stands near this and has welcomed the people from all around for many years now. Fairview cemetery stands close to the church, and has stood for quite some time. Albaton is a wonderful community and welcomes those who visit.

References

Unincorporated communities in Monona County, Iowa
Unincorporated communities in Iowa